The 1986–87 DDR-Oberliga was the 38th season of the DDR-Oberliga, the first tier of league football in East Germany.

The league was contested by fourteen teams. BFC Dynamo won the championship, the club's ninth of ten consecutive East German championships from 1978 to 1988.

Frank Pastor of BFC Dynamo was the league's top scorer with 17 goals, while René Müller of 1. FC Lokomotive Leipzig took out the seasons East German Footballer of the year award.

On the strength of the 1986–87 title BFC Dynamo qualified for the 1987–88 European Cup where the club was knocked out by Girondins de Bordeaux in the first round. Third-placed club 1. FC Lokomotive Leipzig qualified for the 1987–88 European Cup Winners' Cup as the seasons FDGB-Pokal winners and was knocked out by Olympique de Marseille first round. Second-placed Dynamo Dresden qualified for the 1987–88 UEFA Cup where it was knocked out by FC Spartak Moscow in the first round while fourth-placed BSG Wismut Aue lost to KS Flamurtari in the second round.

Table									
The 1986–87 season saw two newly promoted clubs, BSG Energie Cottbus and Fortschritt Bischofswerda.

Results

Gallery

References

Sources

External links
 Das Deutsche Fussball Archiv  Historic German league tables

Ober
1986-87
1